Sold for Marriage is a 1916 American drama film directed by Christy Cabanne for Triangle Film Corporation. Its working title was Marja of the Steppes. The plot concerns a beautiful young Russian village girl who is in love with a young but poor boy but whose guardian wants her to marry a rich old man that she does not love. When she refuses, her uncle arranges for her to be sold for marriage in America. An extant film, a copy preserved at the Library of Congress.

Cast
 Lillian Gish as Marfa
 Frank Bennett as Jan
 Walter Long as Col. Gregioff
 Allan Sears as Ivan (as A.D. Sears)
 Pearl Elmore as Anna
 Curt Rehfeld as Dimitri (as Curt Rehfelt)
 William Lowery as George (as William E. Lowery)
 Fred Burns as A Policeman
 Mike Siebert as The Undesirable Suitor
 Frank Brownlee as Nicholas

References

External links

1916 films
American silent feature films
1916 drama films
American black-and-white films
Films directed by Christy Cabanne
Triangle Film Corporation films
Silent American drama films
1910s American films